Swagelok Company is a $2 billion privately held developer of fluid system products, assemblies, and services for the oil and gas, chemical and petrochemical, semiconductor, and transportation industries.

Headquartered in Solon, Ohio, U.S.A., Swagelok serves customers through approximately 200 sales and service centers in 70 countries, supported by the expertise of more than 5,700 associates at 20 manufacturing facilities and five global technology centers.

History
Fred A. Lennon and Cullen B. Crawford founded Crawford Fitting Company in Cleveland, Ohio, in July 1947 to manufacture the Swagelok® tube fitting, which used a two-ferrule design to “swage” or form the tube and lock it into place. One year later, Lennon bought out Crawford and continued to grow the business.

In 1949, Lennon hired his first employee and established his own manufacturing facility on East 140th Street in Cleveland. In 1965, the company moved to Solon, Ohio, where its headquarters remain.

Also in 1949, the first independent sales and service center opened in the United States. The sales and service network expanded to Europe in 1969 and to Asia in 1972. Today, sales and service centers are located in 70 countries, providing customers with exclusive local inventory, services, and expert support.

Throughout the 1950s and 1960s, Lennon continued to expand the product line through strategically focused companies and brands, including Whitey, Cajon, Nupro, and ‘Sno-Trik. In 1997, the company focused its identity on a single logo and brand name: Swagelok.

Products

Product offerings include fittings, valves, regulators, hoses, filters, sample cylinders, tubing, and measurement devices.

References

External links
 Official Website of Swagelok
 Jump up to:a b c "Company Profile"
 U.S. Patent 3,075,793
 "Swagelok Timeline". Swagelok.
 "Swagelok Company Acquires Innovative Pressure Technologies (IPT) Broadens Valve Line". ThomasNet.com News.
 "Swagelok partners with U.S. Department of Defense on new workforce program for veterans" - cleveland.com
 "Swagelok Co., US Department of Defense partner for SkillBridge Program" - clevelandjewishnews.com
 "Swagelok working with SkillBridge program to help service members gain new skills" - crainscleveland.com
 "Swagelok opens new global headquarters with ceremony in Solon" - cleveland.com

Companies based in Ohio
Cuyahoga County, Ohio
Privately held companies based in Ohio
Manufacturing companies established in 1947
1947 establishments in Ohio